Johan Verner Laaksonen (7 November 1895 – 10 November 1985) was a Finnish long-distance runner. He competed in the marathon at the 1928 Summer Olympics and finished 12th.

References

1895 births
1985 deaths
Finnish male long-distance runners
Olympic athletes of Finland
Athletes (track and field) at the 1928 Summer Olympics
People from Orimattila
Sportspeople from Päijät-Häme